Sparkle Denise McKnight (born 21 December 1991) is a Trinidadian athlete specialising in the 400 metres hurdles. She represented her country at the 2013 and 2015 World Championships in Athletics reaching the semifinals on the second occasion. She was a reserve member of the Trinidadian 4 × 100 metres relay at the 2012 Summer Olympics but ultimately was not chosen to compete.

International competitions

Personal bests
Outdoor
200 metres – 23.29 (+1.9 m/s, Lubbock 2012)
400 metres – 52.17 (Tempe 2013)
400 metres hurdles – 55.41 (San José, Costa Rica 2015)
Indoor
400 metres – 52.52 (Fayetteville 2013)

References

External links
 

1991 births
Living people
People from Chaguanas
Trinidad and Tobago female hurdlers
Trinidad and Tobago female sprinters
Pan American Games competitors for Trinidad and Tobago
Athletes (track and field) at the 2015 Pan American Games
Athletes (track and field) at the 2019 Pan American Games
World Athletics Championships athletes for Trinidad and Tobago
Arkansas Razorbacks women's track and field athletes
Athletes (track and field) at the 2016 Summer Olympics
Olympic athletes of Trinidad and Tobago
Athletes (track and field) at the 2018 Commonwealth Games
Commonwealth Games competitors for Trinidad and Tobago
Competitors at the 2018 Central American and Caribbean Games